Levels of edit (or levels of editing) describes a cumulative or categorical scheme for revising text. Beginning as a tool that helped standardize communication between writers and editors at a government laboratory, published information about levels of edit was later made available to the general public. Subsequently, others developed a variety of levels of edit, which are now accessible through print and web-based resources.

History 
Van Buren and Buehler of the Jet Propulsion Laboratory (JPL) developed five levels of edit defined by nine editorial categories.
 Coordination: Consider version and circulation, Consider the review cycles
 Policy: Consider the organizational structure
 Integrity: Are sources noted? 
 Screening: Consider spelling. Are visuals/art presented with clarity?
 Copy clarification: Are images legible? Are images trimmed?
 Format: What are the layout conventions?  What are the typographical conventions?
 Mechanical style: Check spelling and usage.
 Language: Make edits for clarity and concision.
 Substantive
Level 1 includes all of the above categories, while Level 5 includes only Policy and Coordination.

In 1976, JPL first published Van Buren and Buehler's work as The Levels of Edit. JPL published a second edition in 1980, and the United States Government Printing Office (GPO) sold copies of the book to the general public. After the GPO’s supply of the second edition was depleted, the Society for Technical Communication (STC) made available a facsimile reprint of the second edition.

Drawing on Van Buren and Buehler’s work, in 1985 the writing and editing group at the Los Alamos National Laboratory established four levels of edit for technical reports. A team at the laboratory revised the work following a 1994 survey that indicated the original four levels no longer met authors’ needs. The Los Alamos revision presented three “author-based” levels of edit (proofreading edit, grammar edit, and full edit) whose goals were to “simplify the editing process, focus editing on improving technical clarity, and ensure that value was added in editing.”

More recently, Rude reduced the levels to just two types: 1) comprehensive editing and 2) copyediting. 

Several chapters in New Perspectives on Technical Editing, edited by Avon J. Murphy, include discussions of the different types of edits.

Other researchers built schemes based on editing rules, tasks, and analyses. For example, Tarutz defined a hierarchy of levels that Corbin and Oestreich referred to in their presentation at the 2011 STC Summit as “informal,” as follows.

 Turning pages (a superficial look of the text)
 Skimming (correcting obvious errors of spelling, grammar, and punctuation)
 Skimming and comparing (seeking internal consistency, including cross-references)
 Reading (improving writing style, such as wording and usage)
 Analyzing (identifying and fixing organizational flaws, missing information, redundancy, and technical inconsistency)
 Testing and using (fixing technical errors and resolving usability problems)

To bring a quality assurance perspective to technical editing, Corbin and others mapped types of edit to types of testing, for example, “system testing to comprehensive editing” and “function testing to copyediting” (p. 290).

Other variations 
As web-based on-demand proofreading and editing services have become increasingly available, the number of edit levels and editing schemes has increased in variety. For example, three cumulative levels is a common scheme, typically 1) light, 2) medium, and 3) heavy editing, although another three-level scheme appears frequently across websites: 1) proofreading and 2) light and 3) heavy editing. Four levels usually differs from a three-level scheme only by the inclusion of a mid-range level, such as 1) basic proofreading and 2) light, 3) medium, and 4) heavy editing. No matter the scheme, a level of edit defined as heavy often results in a complete rewrite. And one web-based service offers six levels of edit according to a partially cumulative scheme:
 Basic proofreading
 Complete editing without comments
 Complete editing with comments
 Manuscript critique
 Formatting and layout
 Verification of citation sources.
Based on the function of the edit and the working unit to which it applies, eight levels of edit are also presented, as follows.
 Developmental outline: Technical document
 Technical: Document
 Style: Document
 Literary: Paragraph
 Copy: Sentence
 Format: Character
 Production: Character
 Review: Document

Other references 
Coggin, W. O. and L. R. Porter. 1992. Editing for the Technical Professions. Boston: Allyn & Bacon.

Masse, R. E. 2003. “Theory and Practice of Editing Processes in Technical Communication,” (247-255). D. F. Beer (2nd ed.). Writing and Speaking in the Technology Professions: A Practical Guide. Hoboken, NJ: John Wiley. Reprinted from IEEE Transactions on Professional Communication, (PC-28), no. 1, 34-2, March 1985.

Samson, D. C., Jr. 1993. Editing Technical Writing. New York: Oxford University.

See also 
 Edits
 Editing

External links 
 GPO website
 JPL website
 STC website

Endnotes 

Proofreading
Textual scholarship